Björn Bergmann Sigurðarson (born 26 February 1991) is an Icelandic international footballer who plays as a forward.

He began his career with ÍA in his native Iceland before a three-year spell at Norwegian side Lillestrøm, during which time he made his international debut. In July 2012 he moved to English side Wolverhampton Wanderers for a reported £2.4m fee. His contract with Wolves expired in June 2016 without renewal.

Club career

ÍA
Björn made his debut for his hometown club ÍA in the 2007 Úrvalsdeild. He was mostly employed as a substitute in his first season, but became a regular first team player during the next season. However, ÍA suffered relegation to the second level.

He did not remain at ÍA after their relegation though, and instead signed a three-year contract with Norwegian club Lillestrøm SK in January 2009.

Lillestrøm
After making his club debut on 22 March 2009 against Viking, Björn's first season in the Tippeliga was troubled by numerous lower back injuries. He did manage to make 12 appearances, scoring once (against Bodø/Glimt on 20 September).

In the 2010 season he became regular player for the club, a position he has held ever since. In Autumn 2011 his contract was extended further to run until 2014, though this news was not made public.

In the 2012 season Björn scored seven times in the 11 first league games, as well as four goals in two cup ties.

Wolverhampton Wanderers
On 18 June 2012, Björn's club officially announced that they had accepted an undisclosed bid for him from English side Wolverhampton Wanderers, believed to be in the region of £2.4 million. After passing to a medical and agreeing to personal terms for a four-year contract, the deal was finalised on 17 July 2012.

The Icelandic striker made his Wolves debut as a substitute in an opening day defeat at Leeds United. He scored his first goal for the club in a 2–0 win at Peterborough in late September, the first of five goals during a campaign that ended in relegation to League One.

In the 2013–14 season, under his third different manager during his time at Wolves, Björn failed to hold down a regular place in Wolves' team and on 31 January 2014 he was loaned to Norwegian side Molde for the remainder of 2014 in order to complete the Norwegian league season. During this loan spell he won the league and cup double with Molde.

On 1 January 2016, he came on as a 67th-minute substitute for James Henry in a 1–0 Championship win at Brighton & Hove Albion, his first Wolves appearance for over two years. Björn went on to often be used during the second half of the season, frequently as a lone forward, but failed to score during these 15 appearances, meaning his final goal for Wolves had come almost three years prior, in August 2013.

At the conclusion of the season Wolves announced they would not be renewing his contract. He had made 75 appearances in total for the club, scoring 7 times.

Molde
On 12 July 2016, Björn joined Norwegian club Molde FK on a free transfer. This came after his short loan spell with the club in 2014. He made his debut for Molde on 28 March 2014 in a 2–0 home win against Vålerenga Fotball. In this match, he also scored his first goal for Molde. It came in the 29th minute, and was the first of the game. He was subbed off in the 82nd minute of that match, being replaced by Tommy Høiland.

Rostov
On 5 January 2018, Björn signed a three-and-a-half-year contract with the Russian club FC Rostov.

On 22 January 2020, he was loaned to Cypriot club APOEL.

Return to Lillestrøm
On 14 August 2020, he returned to Lillestrøm and signed a contract until the end of 2020.

Return to Molde
On 1 February 2021, Molde announced the return of Sigurðarson on a two-year contract.

International career
Björn has represented Iceland at numerous youth levels, most recently playing for their Under-21 team in the qualifying competition for the 2013 European Under-21 Championship. He played two matches in the 2011 European Under-21 Championship Finals in Denmark.

He has seven caps for the full Icelandic national team, having made his debut as a substitute in a 1–0 win over Cyprus during Euro 2012 qualification on 6 September 2011. He scored his first goal for the Iceland senior team in a 2–1 World Cup Qualifying win against Kosovo. The goal came in the 25th minute.

He played at China Cup 2017, where Iceland won silver medals

In May 2018 he was named in Iceland's 23-man squad for the 2018 World Cup in Russia.

Personal life
Björn has three half-brothers, Bjarni Guðjónsson, Þórður Guðjónsson, and Joey Guðjónsson, who have all been professional footballers as well as playing for the Icelandic national team. Joey also played for Wolves.

Career statistics

Club

International

Scores and results list Iceland's goal tally first, score column indicates score after each Björn goal.

Honours
Molde
 Tippeligaen: 2014
 Norwegian Cup: 2014

Individual
 Molde top scorer: 17 goals in 2017

References

External links

Official Wolves profile

Björn Bergmann Sigurðarson – Norwegian football statistics

1991 births
Living people
Bjorn Bergmann Sigurdarson
Bjorn Bergmann Sigurdarson
Association football forwards
Bjorn Bergmann Sigurdarson
Bjorn Bergmann Sigurdarson
Bjorn Bergmann Sigurdarson
2018 FIFA World Cup players
Bjorn Bergmann Sigurdarson
Bjorn Bergmann Sigurdarson
Lillestrøm SK players
Wolverhampton Wanderers F.C. players
Eliteserien players
English Football League players
Molde FK players
Danish Superliga players
F.C. Copenhagen players
FC Rostov players
APOEL FC players
Russian Premier League players
Bjorn Bergmann Sigurdarson
Expatriate footballers in Norway
Bjorn Bergmann Sigurdarson
Expatriate footballers in England
Bjorn Bergmann Sigurdarson
Expatriate men's footballers in Denmark
Bjorn Bergmann Sigurdarson
Expatriate footballers in Russia
Bjorn Bergmann Sigurdarson
Expatriate footballers in Cyprus